Bathsheba Rose Demuth is an environmental historian; she is the Dean’s Associate Professor of History and Environment and Society at Brown University. She specializes in the study of the Russian and North American Arctic. Her interest in this region was triggered when she moved north of the Arctic Circle in the Yukon, at the age of 18, and learned a wide range of survival skills in the taiga and tundra.

Early life and education 
Demuth was raised in Decorah, Iowa; she was homeschooled.

Demuth obtained a Bachelor of Arts in Trauma Studies from Brown University in 2006; she completed a masters at Brown in international development in 2007. Demuth pursued doctoral studies at the University of California, Berkeley, receiving her PhD in history in 2016.

Career 
Demuth is best known for her book Floating Coast: An Environmental History of the Bering Strait. The book was published in 2019 by W. W. Norton & Company and has won numerous awards, including the American Society for Environmental History's 2020 George Perkins Marsh Prize for the best book in environmental history and the John H. Dunning Prize from the American Historical Association for the best book in American history. The book was also nominated for the Pushkin Book Prize.

References

External links 

 Brown University webpage
 Personal website

American environmentalists
American historians
Year of birth missing (living people)
Living people
Brown University alumni
University of California, Berkeley alumni
American women historians
21st-century American historians
21st-century American women